"D-Days" is a song by British singer-songwriter Hazel O'Connor, released in March 1981 as a single from her second album, Sons and Lovers. The single was produced by Nigel Gray and remixed for single release by Tony Visconti, who had produced her previous album Breaking Glass. The song stands for 'Decadent Days' and was inspired by a trip to a night in London where there were lots of poseurs and "people looking very bizarre". It peaked at number 10 on the UK Singles Chart.

Reception 
Reviewing the song for Record Mirror, Rosalind Russell wrote that "the smart marching pace suits Hazel's sense of style and drama and she hasn't deviated too far from her previous material to risk failure. This has a slap-in-the-face sting to it that should see her through to another hit". David Hepworth for Smash Hits wrote "eight bars into this and I'm reaching for Red Starr's [sic] Russian fur hat and cossack dancing round the office like a good'un. Hazel keeps the mannerisms down to a minimum and seems to have her best chance of a hit in a while.

Track listings 
7": Albion / ION 1009 (UK)

 "D-Days" – 2:48
 "Time is Free" – 3:28

12": Albion / 12 ION 1009 (UK)

 "D-Days"
 "Zoo"
 "Time is Free"

Personnel 
Musicians

 Hazel O'Connor – lead vocals
 Eddie Case – drums, backing vocals
 Andy Qunta – keyboards, backing vocals
 Neil O'Connor – guitar, backing vocals
 Steve Kinch – bass guitar, backing vocals
 Wesley Magoogan – saxophone, backing vocals

Technical

 Gordon Fordyce – recording engineer, mixing (only "Time is Free")
 Tony Visconti – mixing (only "D-Days")
 Nigel Gray – producer
 Edward Bell – sleeve artwork

Charts

References 

1980 songs
1981 singles
Hazel O'Connor songs
Song recordings produced by Nigel Gray